Libuše Jahodová (born 31 May 1992) is a Czech shooter. She represented her country at the 2016 Summer Olympics.

References 

1992 births
Living people
Czech female sport shooters
Shooters at the 2016 Summer Olympics
Olympic shooters of the Czech Republic
Universiade medalists in shooting
Sportspeople from Liberec
Universiade gold medalists for the Czech Republic
European Games competitors for the Czech Republic
Shooters at the 2015 European Games
Medalists at the 2015 Summer Universiade
21st-century Czech women